KCFH is a class A radio station broadcasting to Two Harbors, California. It serves Santa Catalina Island.

History

KCFH began broadcasting on July 24, 2013.

References

External links
 

2013 establishments in California
Mass media in Los Angeles County, California
CFH
Radio stations established in 2013